Socialist Action may refer to a number of current and former political parties and organisations, mainly in the Trotskyist tradition:

Current
Socialist Action (Canada)
Socialist Action (Hong Kong)
Socialist Action (UK)
Socialist Action (United States)

Former
Socialist Action (Australia)
Socialist Action League, the former name of the Trotskyist Communist League (New Zealand)
Socialist Action Party (PASOC), a left breakaway from the Spanish Socialist Workers' Party that  participated in the formation of the United Left (Spain)
League for Socialist Action (Canada), a Trotskyist group in Canada that merged to form the Revolutionary Workers League in 1977
League for Socialist Action (UK), a Trotskyist group in the United Kingdom that remerged with the International Marxist Group in 1982